Dildariyaan is an Indian Punjabi-language romance film directed by Pankaj Batra. Jassi Gill and Sagarika Ghatge played the lead roles, and marks Ghatge's debut in a Punjabi movie. Dildariyaan was released on 9 October 2015.

Plot
Paali (Sagarika Ghatge) lives at home with her father (Guggu Gill) in their small village. To complete her Higher Studies, Paali shifts to Chandigarh where she meets Parvan (Jassi Gill), a smart collegian who falls in love with her. However, Paali is less than interested because her father has already found her a NRI husband. Although Paali tells Parvan about her arranged husband, Parvan refuses to give up and seeks to impress on Paali's father that he is a better match.after that he convinced paali's father for their marriage and paali's father call her for come back to  India.

Cast
Jassi Gill as Parwaan
Sagarika Ghatge as Paali
Binnu Dhillon as Bus Conductor
Karamjit Anmol as Pardhaan (Parwaan's friend)
Guggu Gill as Paali's Dad
 Manpreet Kaur Gill as Aman
 Razia Sukhbir as IELTS Teacher
 Rajwinder Singh Bhinder as Teacher
 Baninder Banni as Scootry

Soundtrack

The soundtrack of Dildariyaan consists of 5 songs composed by Jatinder Shah.

Reception

Box office
Dildariyaan grossed  from international markets in its first weekend.

References

External links
 

Punjabi-language Indian films
2010s Punjabi-language films
Films directed by Pankaj Batra
Films scored by Jatinder Shah